Mahatama Gandhi Marg, also known as MG Marg, is one of the major streets in Allahabad, named after Mahatma Gandhi. It stretches from Allahabad High Court in the east making intersection with PD Tondon Marg and Nyaya Marg, passing through Civil Lines to the west until it ends at the esplanade. It is lined by shops, malls and a number of historical and religious buildings and offices including notable landmarks like All Saints Cathedral and Alfred Park in the north. It intersects with Sardar Patel Marg making Subash Cross, a notable town square of the city.

The road was formerly Canning Road,  named after Lord Canning, Governor-General of India from 1856 to 1862.

See also:
List of streets and roads in Allahabad

Transport in Allahabad
Roads in Uttar Pradesh